Canadian Monopoly is an edition of the popular board game Monopoly. It features Canadian properties, railways, and utilities, rather than the original version which is based in Atlantic City, New Jersey.

The Canadian edition was originally released in 1982. An updated version was released in 2000, and another updated version was issued in 2010.

1982 edition
The properties (clockwise) span Canada from east to west, with streets in St. John's at the beginning of the circuit, with streets in Vancouver and Victoria taking over for "Boardwalk" and "Park Place." All four railways are Canadian lines, and the police officer depicted on the "Go to Jail" space is a Mountie. A beaver token is included in the player pieces.

2000 edition
The 2000 edition brought further changes from the Monopoly standard. Player pieces now include a moose, a canoe, a hockey player, and the aforementioned beaver. "Community Chest" and "Chance" cards are now called "Federal" or "Provincial"; one card depicts striking oil in Alberta and being awarded the Order of Canada. Several of the properties, railways, and utilities were reordered or changed.

2010 edition
For the 2010 edition of the game, an online contest was conducted in which participants were asked to vote for cities to be on the new board. Unlike the earlier editions, properties were arranged in their final vote order, and are not in any specific geographic arrangement. In this edition of the game, there are no cities from the Maritimes, Saskatchewan, Manitoba, Northwest Territories, the Yukon and Nunavut.
Hasbro said that this edition would feature updated Chance and Community Chest cards that will "highlight events and culturally relevant scenarios from Canada".

1982 board layout

2000 board layout

2010 board layout

References

Board games introduced in 1982
Canadian board games
Monopoly (game)